Kosmos 142 ( meaning Cosmos 142), also known as DS-U2-I No.2, was a Soviet satellite which was launched in 1967 as part of the Dnepropetrovsk Sputnik programme. It was a  spacecraft, which was built by the Yuzhnoye Design Bureau, and was used to study the effects on radio waves of passing through the ionosphere.

A Kosmos-2I 63SM carrier rocket was used to launch Kosmos 142 into low Earth orbit. The launch took place from Site 86/1 at Kapustin Yar. The launch occurred at 10:04:56 GMT on 14 February 1967, and resulted in the successful insertion of the satellite into orbit. Upon reaching orbit, the satellite was assigned its Kosmos designation, and received the International Designator 1967-013A. The North American Air Defense Command assigned it the catalogue number 02678.

Kosmos 142 was the second of three DS-U2-I satellites to be launched. On 6 July 1967, it decayed from orbit and reentered the atmosphere.

See also

 1967 in spaceflight

References

Spacecraft launched in 1967
Kosmos satellites
1967 in the Soviet Union
Dnepropetrovsk Sputnik program